The Hebrew Congregation of Woodmont is an historic, 1926 beach (summer, resort) synagogue at 15-17 Edgefield Avenue in Woodmont, Connecticut, United States. The synagogue was listed on the National Register of Historic Places in 1995.

Historic building
The small, wood-frame, clapboard synagogue was built in the Colonial Revival style typical of small New England towns for seasonal use by Jewish families who came to stay on the beach in the summer months. An adjacent social hall was built in 1946.

In 2012, the historic building was badly damaged by a fire, caused by an electrical wiring problem.  A reconstruction was quickly planned to restore both the 1926 sanctuary and the adjacent 1946 social hall, which suffered minor damage. The social hall was restored in time for the High Holy Days in 2013.

Congregation
The congregation began in 1920, meeting during the summer months in the vacation home of Rabbi Yehuda Heschel Levenberg.  Ground was broken for a permanent synagogue building in 1926, and completed by the summer vacation season of 1927.  A summer Sunday school opened in 1936, and a social hall was built in 1946.  By the early 21st century, however, the summer population had declined and the diminished congregation hired Rabbi Schneur and Chanie Wilhelm of the Chabad movement in 2007 with the hope that they could attract enough members to make the Hebrew Congregation into a year-round synagogue. As of 2014, services were being held on the Sabbath and Jewish holidays year-round.

See also
National Register of Historic Places listings in New Haven County, Connecticut

References

External links
Chabad Jewish Center of Milford - Hebrew Congregation of Woodmont
Bagel Beach Historical Association

Synagogues on the National Register of Historic Places in Connecticut
Synagogues completed in 1926
Buildings and structures in Milford, Connecticut
Orthodox synagogues in Connecticut
National Register of Historic Places in New Haven County, Connecticut
Colonial Revival synagogues
Clapboard synagogues